A list of films produced in Russia in 2013 (see 2013 in film).

2013

See also
 2013 in film
 2013 in Russia

References

External links

2013
Fil
Lists of 2013 films by country or language